Peppermint Frappé is a 1967 Spanish psychological thriller directed by  Carlos Saura, starring Geraldine Chaplin and José Luis López Vázquez. The story centers on a man who becomes obsessed with the wife of an old friend, believing her to be a mysterious drummer that he once fell in love with at a festival.  He pursues her only to be rebuffed multiple times.

Plot
A pair of hands meticulously crops images from a fashion magazine for a personal scrapbook. The hands belong to an unassuming and conservative physician named Julián. He runs a radiology clinic from his personal residence, assisted by a shy, mild mannered nurse named Ana.

One afternoon, Julián is invited to the house of the mother of his friend Pablo, where a reunion of the two childhood pals has been arranged. Pablo is a charismatic and sophisticated adventurer who has recently returned from Africa with the unexpected news that he has married a beautiful and carefree young woman named Elena. Pablo hands Julián a drink, his favorite cocktail, peppermint frappe, as the group awaits the entrance of Elena, who is upstairs dressing. The sight of the captivating Elena visibly stuns Julián, as Elena reminds him of a mysterious woman he had seen beating drums during the famous Holy Week ritual in the village of Calanda. She insists that she has never seen him before, nor has she ever been to Calanda. Despite her rebukes, Julián finds himself immediately drawn to Elena's cosmopolitan demeanor.

During the days following their first encounter, Julián becomes increasingly infatuated with Pablo’s bride and finds pretext to spend time with her. While Pablo is busy, Julián takes Elena sightseeing Cuenca. Despite her indifference to his attentions, Julián’s obsession with Elena does not diminish. Frustrated by his inability to win Elena's affection, Julián turns his attention to his laboratory assistant, Ana, who has secretly pined for Julián. A sexual liaison between the two is soon established. Julián manipulates Ana, coercing her to dress and groom herself like Elena does.

While involved with Ana, Julián continues to pursue the elusive Elena, but she resists his advances with open derision. Julián invites Pablo and Elena to his cottage on the countryside to spend the weekend. He takes them on a tour of the grounds of the abandoned spa where he and Pablo used to play as children.

After a practical joke by Pablo and Elena, aimed at humiliating Julián, Julián begins to plan an elaborate revenge against the couple. Picking up Elena’s curiosity about his relationship with Ana, Julián invites Elena and Pablo to join him and Ana in his country house.

Before Pablo and Elena arrive, Julián places what appears to be poison in a decanter containing peppermint frappe. When Pablo and Elena arrive, Julián tells them that Ana will be a little late and offers them the beverage. After a few sips, the couple begins to ridicule Julián once again. When they succumb to the poison, Julián carries their bodies to their car which he causes to roll off a cliff, giving the appearance that the couple had died in an automobile accident. Returning to his country house, Julián finds Ana now dressed as the woman of Calanda. The film ends as the two embrace.

Cast
Geraldine Chaplin – Elena/ Ana/ Woman of Calanda
José Luis López Vázquez – Julián
Alfredo Mayo – Pablo
Ana Maria Custodio – Pablo’s mother
Emiliano Redondo – Arturo
Fernando Sánchez Polack – patient

Reception
The film was Saura's first significant commercial success. Peppermint Frappé won the Silver Bear for Best Director award at the 18th Berlin International Film Festival. It was listed to compete at the 1968 Cannes Film Festival, which was cancelled due to the events of May 1968 in France.

Analysis
Being a direct hommage to Vertigo, Peppermint Frappé uses Julián's obsession with the Hitchcockian blonde woman to illustrate Spain's suppressed fascination with the "foreign" West as well as repressed desires under the nationalist and isolationist regime of Francisco Franco. Furthermore the film is an examination of repression and obsession during Franco's era in Spain. Additionally, the character of Julián's nurse, also played by Chaplin, serves as an interesting example of how a passive feminine character can come to control a more assertive chauvinist by manipulating his desires. In Peppermint Frappé, a single actress and a handful of motifs create a chain of associations whose stylistic sophistication belies the seeming simplicity of the film’s linear plotline. Saura intended for the film to be an homage to his mentor, director Luis Buñuel, who was from Calanda.

DVD release
 Peppermint Frappé   is available in Region 2  DVD in Spanish without English subtitles.  There is no Region 1 DVD available.

References

External links

Rotten Tomatoes
 Purdue Essay

1967 films
1967 drama films
1960s psychological thriller films
Spanish drama films
1960s Spanish-language films
Spain in fiction
Films directed by Carlos Saura
Films set in country houses
Films set in Spain
Films shot in the province of Cuenca
Films with screenplays by Rafael Azcona
Spanish psychological thriller films